...Too is the second studio album by American songwriter Carole Bayer Sager, released in 1978 by Elektra Records. The album reached number 68 on the Australian chart.

Track listing

Personnel

Musicians

 Carole Bayer Sager – lead vocals, organ (7)
 Ira Newborn – acoustic guitar (5), guitar (6, 7, 10)
 Thom Rotella – acoustic guitar (3)
 Don Costa – arrangements (1)
 David Foster – arrangements , keyboards (2, 8), synthesizer (5)
 Paul Buckmaster – arrangements (3, 7)
 David Campbell – arrangements (5, 6, 7, 9)
 Marvin Hamlisch – arrangements (5, 7), piano (1, 6)
 Jerry Hey – arrangements, trumpet (8)
 Bill Champlin – background vocals (2, 8)
 Michael McDonald – background vocals (2)
 Melissa Manchester – background vocals, piano (3)
 Alice Cooper – background vocals (4)
 Bruce Roberts – background vocals, piano (4, 9)
 Brenda Russell – background vocals (7)
 Carmen Twillie – background vocals (8)
 Weddy Gloud – background vocals (8)
 David Lasley – background vocals (9)
 Luther Vandross – background vocals (9)
 David Hungate – bass (2, 8)
 Lee Sklar – bass (5–7, 9)
 Reinie Press – bass (3)
 Richard Davis – bass (10)
 Ed Greene – drums (2, 6)
 Jeff Porcaro – drums (8)
 Jim Gordon – drums (3)
 Jim Keltner – drums (9, 10)
 Russ Kunkel – drums (5, 7)
 Jim Hughart – electric bass (10)
 Lee Ritenour – electric guitar (3), guitar (7)
 Steve Lukather – electric guitar (5), guitar (2, 6, 8)
 Craig Doerge – electric piano (5, 7)
 Michael Rubini – electric piano (10)
 Johnny Vastano – guitar (7)
 Jay Graydon – guitar (8)
 Richie Zito – guitar (9)
 Art Smith – ocarina (7)
 Dick Hazard – orchestrations (10)
 Alan Estes – percussion (7, 10)
 Steve Forman – percussion (2)
 Skip Redwine – piano (10)
 Kim Hutchcroft – reeds (8)
 Larry Williams – reeds (8)
 Nino Tempo – saxophone (1)
 Steve Porcaro – synthesizer (3, 5, 8)
 Bill Reichenbach – trombone (8)
 George Bohanon – trombone (8)
 Gary Grant – trumpet (8)
 Jennifer Sloan – vocals (7)

Production
 Jill Harris – production coordination
 Bob Merritt – sound engineer
 Brooks Arthur – sound engineer, producer
 Ira Leslie – sound engineer
 Gabe Veltri – sound engineer
 Rich Feldman – sound engineer
 David Latman – sound engineer
 Bernie Grundman – mastering

Design
 Ron Coro – design
 Ethan Russell – photography

Charts

References

External links
 

1978 albums
Carole Bayer Sager albums
Elektra Records albums